William Raymond Fell  (26 October 1904 – 12 November 1986) was a New Zealand police officer. He was born in Melksham, Wiltshire, England, on 26 October 1904.

In the 1964 Queen's Birthday Honours, Fell was awarded the Queen's Police Medal for Distinguished Service.

References

1904 births
1986 deaths
New Zealand police officers
People from Melksham
New Zealand recipients of the Queen's Police Medal
English emigrants to New Zealand